During the 2005–06 season, Aston Villa competed in the FA Premier League.

After the previous seasons tenth placed finish Villa never recovered from a poor start which left them at times close to the bottom 3 and despite some impressive wins which ultimately kept Villa in the league discontent among the fans at an uncomfortable relegation battle grew and lead to manager David O'Leary being sacked after the end of the season.

Final league table

Pre-season

Results
Aston Villa's score comes first

Legend

Results summary

Results per matchday

FA Premier League

FA Cup

League Cup

Players

First-team squad
Squad at end of season

Left club during season

Reserve squad

Youth squad

Other players
The following players did not play for any Aston Villa team this season.

Statistics

Appearances and goals
As of end of season

|-
! colspan=14 style=background:#dcdcdc; text-align:center| Goalkeepers

|-
! colspan=14 style=background:#dcdcdc; text-align:center| Defenders

|-
! colspan=14 style=background:#dcdcdc; text-align:center| Midfielders

|-
! colspan=14 style=background:#dcdcdc; text-align:center| Forwards

|-
! colspan=14 style=background:#dcdcdc; text-align:center| Players who left club during season

|-

Transfers

In

 Patrik Berger – Portsmouth, 17 May, free
 Aaron Hughes – Newcastle United, 20 May, £1,000,000
 Kevin Phillips – Southampton, 29 June, £1,000,000
 Milan Baroš – Liverpool, 23 August, £6,500,000
 Wilfred Bouma – PSV, 30 August, £3,500,000
 James Milner – Newcastle United, 31 August, season-long loan
 Eirik Bakke – Leeds United, 31 August, loan

Out
 Thomas Hitzlsperger – VfB Stuttgart, 13 April, free
 Stefan Moore – Queens Park Rangers, 13 June, free
 Darius Vassell – Manchester City, 27 July, £2,000,000
  Nolberto Solano – Newcastle United, 31 August, £1,500,000
  Stefan Postma – Wolverhampton Wanderers, 6 January, undisclosed
  Wayne Henderson – Brighton & Hove Albion
  Steven Foley – AFC Bournemouth

Loan out
  Stefan Postma – Wolverhampton Wanderers, 19 August, five-month loan
  Mathieu Berson – Auxerre, 25 August, season-long loan

References

Notes

External links
Aston Villa official website
avfchistory.co.uk 2005–06 season

Aston Villa F.C. seasons
Aston Villa